Jetpac Refuelled is an arcade-style shooter video game developed by Rare and published by Microsoft Studios. It was released worldwide on the Xbox Live Arcade service on March 28, 2007. The game is the fourth installment of the Jetman series and a remake of Ultimate Play the Game's 1983 ZX Spectrum game, Jetpac. The game follows Jetman as he attempts to rebuild his rocket in order to explore different planets, whilst simultaneously defending himself from hostile aliens.

Details of the game were leaked in February 2007, shortly before Rare announced development one month later. During the development process, Rare attempted to ensure that the game did not feel too similar to the original Jetpac, while keeping the core mechanics. The game received mostly favorable reviews upon release. Critics praised the updated graphics and gameplay, however they criticized the overall repetitiveness of the game and its multiplayer mode. It was later rereleased as part of Rare's 2015 Xbox One compendium compilation Rare Replay, along with all three original Jetman games.

Gameplay

The game is a remake of the original Jetpac with overhauled high-definition graphics and 128 levels. It also features competitive gameplay over Xbox Live, leaderboards, and achievements. Similar to the first instalment, the player assumes control of Jetman and is presented in a horizontal wrap around which consists of six platforms on which Jetman can manoeuvre onto. Jetman has to first assemble his rocket, which spawns in separate parts that are scattered around a map, and then fills it with six fuel canisters before taking off to the next planet, where the procedure is repeated. In addition, Jetman has to defend himself from each planet's hostile aliens, and collect valuable resources such as gold and platinum, which occasionally fall from the atmosphere, for bonus points.

Jetman's only usable weapon in his laser. Weapon upgrades may also spawn around a map, which once picked up will give Jetman various upgrades to his weapon. Upgrades include as a wider fire spread, faster projectiles or higher damage. The player starts the game with three nuclear devices, which once used will eliminate all enemies from the screen. Jetman also has the ability to boost, which will temporarily make him move at a much faster speed, although boosts will need to recharge once they are depleted.

Jetpac Refuelled features a multiplayer mode that can be played either offline using a split screen or online via Xbox Live. In this mode, the player has to compete one-on-one in a race to build and refuel their craft before their opponent does. Fuel and rocket pickups can be stolen from opponents by shooting them or by using an EMP blast at close range. Lives are unlimited in multiplayer and the winner is determined by the highest score. A version of the original 1983 Jetpac is also included in the game.

Development

Details of a Jetpac remake were first leaked on a listing on the website of German rating board Unterhaltungssoftware Selbstkontrolle on February 6, 2007. Rare officially announced development of Jetpac Refuelled later on February 22.

In a retrospective interview, Rare designers Jens Restemeier and Nick Burton took interest in the then-upcoming Xbox Live Arcade and offered to develop a new game for the service after the release of Rare's Xbox 360 launch titles Kameo and Perfect Dark Zero. Because of the smaller scale of the project, the team had total creative control and were generally left alone throughout development. Rather than simply porting the original ZX Spectrum title to the Xbox 360, the development team decided to expand upon Jetpac and experiment with new elements. The team ensured to keep the original core mechanics of the Jetpac whilst designing new features for the game. Restemeier also stated that the development process for an Xbox Live Arcade game differed from a retail title, owing to processing power limitations that had to be constantly synced over Xbox Live. Burton asserted that one of the differences with development on the Xbox Live service was the way optimizations shifted from graphics and game logic, stating that this was more difficult than it would have been for an Xbox 360 title such as Kameo.

In a separate interview with Next-Gen magazine, Burton stated that during initial development of Jetpac Refuelled, senior management kept away entirely from the project. When Rare's management allowed themselves to view the game, they offered the developers "a fresh eye and more frank criticism". Further development took place before management were shown the game again in what was nicknamed a "clean room" test. Jetpac Refuelled, along with every title in the Jetman series, appeared in the retrospective 2015 retrospective compilation of 30 Rare titles, Rare Replay for Xbox One.

Reception

The game was met with mostly favourable reviews upon release. Reviewers praised the updated graphics and addictive gameplay, however they criticised the overall repetitiveness of the game and its mediocre multiplayer mode. It received an aggregate score of 72% from GameRankings based on 16 reviews, and an average score of 73 out of 100 on Metacritic, based on 17 reviews. Kristan Reed of Eurogamer praised the visual makeover the new game, calling it "undoubtedly the best addition" to the series. Greg Stewart of GamesRadar labelled the updated graphics as "trippy", preferring them over the "primitive" original. Jeff Gerstmann of GameSpot praised the updated graphics as the best addition to the game, heralding them as "crisp, bright and colourful" and far superior to the original 1983 version. Jonathan Miller of IGN similarly thought the graphics were the strongest aspect of the game, praising the effects as "vibrant and colourful" whilst calling the ZX Spectrum version "nostalgically bad". Miller also added that the updated visuals of the game made the experience feel "almost 10 times the game as the original".

Reed criticised the repetitiveness of the game, stating that whilst 128 levels was good value for money, the gameplay was "merely a repeat" of what the player has already accomplished and that the multiplayer mode could prove "annoying very quickly". Stewart also criticised the game's repetitiveness and stated that he felt general gameplay was "shallow", despite admitting it was addictive. Gerstmann similarly found the action repetitive and stated that there was "not enough variety", especially in the multiplayer mode. However, Miller praised the gameplay as "fast, fun and addictive", as he expected a game on the Xbox Live Arcade to be. Will Freeman of Video Gamer noted that the large number of levels caused the game to feel repetitive, but praised the overall addictiveness and fast pace of the game.

References

2007 video games
Microsoft games
Rare (company) games
Video game remakes
Xbox 360 Live Arcade games
Xbox 360-only games
Xbox 360 games
Xbox Cloud Gaming games
Video games scored by Steve Burke
Video games set on fictional planets
Multiplayer and single-player video games
Video games developed in the United Kingdom